CKNW is a news/talk formatted radio station in Vancouver, British Columbia, owned by Corus Entertainment. It broadcasts on an assigned frequency of AM 980 kHz, and is unusual in that it is a 50,000-watt, Class A station broadcasting on a regional (not clear-channel) frequency. CKNW uses a four-tower directional antenna from a site near Surrey, while its studios are located at TD Tower in Downtown Vancouver.

History 
CKNW began in New Westminster, British Columbia, on August 15, 1944, at its original frequency of 1230 AM, under the ownership of Bill Rea's International Broadcasting Company. It was Vancouver's first country station, the first in the region to provide hourly newscasts (between 6:00 a.m. and midnight) and the first in the province to broadcast 24 hours a day, beginning in 1947.

In 1947, Rea purchased a half-interest in Port Alberni radio station CJAV. Several personalities who started there would move to CKNW. These included Joe Chesney, who became morning show host until moving on to establish Langley station CJJC (now CKST in Vancouver) in 1963, and Jim Robson, who would provide play-by-play for the newly established Vancouver Canucks of the NHL beginning in 1970. On January 2, 1949, CKNW switched frequencies to 1320 AM and increased its power from 250 watts to 1,000. The station again increased power to 5,000 watts on November 5, 1954.

Jack Webster advanced talk-show radio methods during his time with CKNW in the 1960s.

WIC ownership
In February 1956, Bill Rea, experiencing health problems, sold CKNW to Frank Griffiths and the Allard family, who went on to form Western Broadcasting Company, which later became Western International Communications (WIC). In February 1958, long time CKNW Creative Director Tony Antonias wrote a jingle that was introduced on CKNW in April 1958, and used across western Canada for years for the famous Woodward's "$1.49 Day" sale (said aloud as "dollar forty-nine day") on the first Tuesday of every month.

On November 17, 1958, the station switched to its present frequency of 980 AM. On February 22, 1960, its transmission power was increased to 10,000 watts, and it was further increased to 50,000 watts in 1965. On January 15, 1969, CKNW moved into larger studio space in a former Safeway store in New Westminster. Parent company Western Broadcasting put FM sister station CFMI on the air on March 22, 1970.

CKNW founder Bill Rea died on April 15, 1983, in Santa Barbara, California at age 74. On October 3, 1983, the station began broadcasting in AM stereo. On June 18, 1984, it became the flagship station of the Western Information Network, broadcasting programs via satellite to affiliate stations throughout British Columbia.

During Expo 86 CKNW moved their Holiday Inn Hotel Talk studio to a new facility in the BC Pavilion Complex. CKNW broadcast on site for the duration of the World's Fair. All CKNW Talk programming aired from the Expo Studio until 1997.

In mid December 1995, CKNW became the first commercial radio station in Canada to stream 24/7 over the internet.

During the 1990s, CKNW made a gradual transition from the mixed format of news, sports, talk shows and MOR music it had adopted in the 1960s to full-time news, talk and sports. In 1996, CKNW and CFMI moved again to their current studios in the TD Tower at Pacific Centre in Downtown Vancouver.

Corus ownership

In 2000, both CKNW and CFMI were purchased by Corus Entertainment as part of the splitting of WIC's broadcasting assets; Corus acquired WIC's radio stations and pay-TV assets while WIC's broadcast TV stations, including CHAN-DT (BCTV, now Global BC) in the Vancouver area, were purchased by Canwest. Canwest ultimately went bankrupt in 2010, selling the bulk of its broadcast properties including Global BC to Corus sibling company Shaw Communications, which in turn transferred them to Corus in 2016.

In February 2001, Corus Entertainment launched an all-news sister station, NW2. This new station (CJNW AM730, formerly CKLG) was branded as "24 hour news radio, powered by CKNW." NW2 shared newsroom resources with CKNW, including several anchors and reporters. However, NW2 did not achieve broad appeal, and was shut down in May 2002.

Since 2001, CKNW has gone through two significant restructurings focused on reducing costs, which resulted in dozens of lay-offs. Several senior reporters have left CKNW for other opportunities. The cost-cutting decisions made by Corus, along with the increase in infomercials, has correspondingly resulted in CKNW suffering a steady erosion of its listening audience.

CKNW lost the BC Lions CFL broadcast rights to Team 1040 in 2004. The station had broadcast the games continuously since 1985. In 2006, CKNW lost the rights to broadcast Vancouver Canucks games to Team 1040 as well after broadcasting every one of the club's games since their inaugural NHL season in 1970. The loss of the Canucks games may have resulted in the station losing nearly a third of their cumulative audience in the Fall ratings of 2006. 

In November 2015, CKNW was added to sister station CFMI-FM HD2 sub-channel to HD Radio service, becoming the first AM station in Vancouver and British Columbia to do so.

Lineup
Morning and afternoon show hosts include Simi Sara (Mornings With Simi), Mike Smyth (The Mike Smyth Show), Jas Johal (The Jas Johal Show), Jill Bennett (The Jill Bennett Show), and Ben O’Hara-Byrne in the evening. All of these programs follow a similar format and broadcast strictly on CKNW except for the O’Hara-Byrne program which is heard on various stations across Canada.

CKNW/Global news department produces newscasts every hour, with more frequent updates during the day.

Mark Madryga is CKNW's weather meteorologist whose reports can be heard during the morning news. Global BC's Kristi Gordon is the substitute forecaster.

The station's traffic department provides extensive reports with traffic every 10 minutes on the 4s during drive times. Elaine Scollan does the AM Drive from the CKNW helicopter, while Kim Larsson covers the PM shift.

The station added a weekend morning show in March 2008 which follows a similar format to weekday mornings, but with less frequent traffic and news updates.

Former Hosts and Programs
Christy Clark hosted a weekday talk show on the station from 2007 to 2010, before returning to politics and becoming Premier of British Columbia. Her afternoon slot was taken over by Simi Sara. In 2020, Simi Sara moved to the morning slot, replacing Jon McComb.

Rafe Mair, a well-known talk show host, was with CKNW for 19 years, before being dismissed in 2003.

Dan Russell's "Sportstalk" was the longest running sports talk show in Canada but ended on CKNW in September 2013. The show was revived on CISL radio briefly, before ending on that station on May 1, 2014.

Long time radio broadcaster Bill Good retired after nearly 26 years with CKNW on August 1, 2014.

Sean Leslie used to host CKNW's weekend afternoon talk program (The Sean Leslie Show).

Other talk-show programs included Drex Live.

CKNW aired the syndicated program Coast to Coast AM and on weekends the Ted Radio Hour.

Broadcast code violation
In 2007, the Canadian Broadcast Standards Council faulted CKNW for airing "potentially dangerous information" during the Dawson College shooting. During the incident, CKNW had simulcast content from its sister stations in Montreal which included students speaking by cellphone from inside the school. A Vancouver man complained that the content could have told the gunman where the students were. The council said that as a result of modern technology reducing geographic distance as a barrier, CKNW had breached Section 10 (coverage of violent situations) of the broadcast code. The station broadcast the decision as required, but did not air an apology and the station manager said it was a "one-off situation" that would not affect CKNW's policies.

References

External links 
 Global News Radio 980 CKNW
 
 
 BBM.ca
 Radio locator CKNW

Radio stations established in 1944
Knw
New Westminster
Knw
Knw
1944 establishments in British Columbia